The Hồ chicken or gà Hồ is a Vietnamese breed of chicken, originating in Bắc Ninh Province. It is one of many local chicken varieties in Vietnam including: gà Ri (the most popular breed), gà Tàu Vàng, gà Nòi, gà Đông Tảo, gà Mía, gà Tam Hoàng, gà Lương Phượng, etc.

References 

Chicken breeds originating in Vietnam
Chicken breeds